Maksyutovo (Mäqsüt) is a rural locality (a village) in Kashkarovsky Selsoviet, Zilairsky District, Bashkortostan, Russia. The population was 83 as of 2010. There are 2 streets.

Geography 
Maksyutovo is located 39 km east of Zilair (the district's administrative centre) by road. Izhbuldy is the nearest rural locality.

References 

Rural localities in Zilairsky District